Kalaharia  is a genus of flowering plant in the family Lamiaceae, first described in 1891. It contains only one known species, Kalaharia uncinata. It is native to central + southern Africa from Cape Province of South Africa north to Gabon and Tanzania.

References

External links
 

Lamiaceae
Flora of Southern Africa
Flora of South Tropical Africa
Flora of West-Central Tropical Africa
Plants described in 1835
Taxa named by Henri Ernest Baillon